Thomas Fraser (26 June 1912 – 25 July 1995) was a South African cricketer. He played first-class cricket for Cambridge University and Orange Free State between 1936 and 1948.

References

External links
 

1912 births
1995 deaths
South African cricketers
Cambridge University cricketers
Free State cricketers
People from Natal
Free Foresters cricketers
South African expatriate sportspeople in England